The Gamemaster Series of board games consists of five war simulation games released by the game company Milton Bradley beginning in 1984. The games were not developed "in-house" by Milton Bradley, with each game initially published in limited runs by smaller game publishers in the early 1980s before their rights were acquired by Milton Bradley. Despite this, some modern reissues of these games refer to the Milton Bradley versions as the "first edition" of each game.

The original Milton Bradley Gamemaster Series included:
 Axis & Allies (1984)
 Conquest of the Empire (1984)
 Broadsides and Boarding Parties (1984)
 Fortress America (1986)
 Shogun (1986)

The first three games were designed by Larry Harris, while the last two were designed by Mike Gray, though neither were credited for their creations until their subsequent re-releases. Of these five, Axis & Allies was the most successful, spawning several revised versions, spinoffs, computer games, and a miniature game series, though Conquest of the Empire, Fortress America, and Shogun also saw some success. Broadsides and Boarding Parties was the most significant departure from the strategic focus of the other titles in the series, instead featuring a two-player duel between naval vessels.

The rights to four of the five games in the series are currently held by Hasbro. Though all five games were released under the Milton Bradley umbrella, by the 1990s Axis & Allies was the only game being continually updated. In 1999, Milton Bradley's parent company, Hasbro, moved Axis & Allies to its Avalon Hill imprint, which specialized in board wargames. In 2004, Avalon Hill was made into a subsidiary of Wizards of the Coast, another Hasbro imprint that specialized in board games for a more dedicated "gamer" audience. Shogun is also currently published by Avalon Hill, but retitled Ikusa.

Reissues
Avalon Hill began publishing Axis & Allies spin-off titles in 1999, focusing on the Europe and Pacific theaters as well as tactical recreations of specific battles. The 1984 edition of Axis & Allies remained the flagship product in the series until the 2004 release of Axis & Allies: Revised, introducing to the main game some units and rules that originated in the spin-off titles. Axis & Allies was later chosen as one of three board games re-released to celebrate the 50th anniversary of Avalon Hill in 2008, with that anniversary version of Axis & Allies featuring board set-up options to start the game in 1941 instead of 1942. From that point onward, additional revised editions of the main game as well as spin-offs focusing on theaters or battles would include a starting year in the game's title. In 2013, Avalon Hill published the first game outside of the series' World War II setting called Axis & Allies: WWI 1914. Computer game adaptations of the original Axis & Allies were released by Hasbro Interactive in 1998 and Atari in 2004. A miniature wargaming series was introduced by Avalon Hill in 2005.

Shogun was renamed twice to avoid confusion with other board games of the same name, first becoming Samurai Swords in 1995 while still carrying the branding of Milton Bradley's Gamemaster Series and then becoming Ikusa in 2011 when reissued by Avalon Hill. Conquest of the Empire was re-released by Eagle Games in 2005 with updated rules. Fortress America was reissued with slightly revised cover art to remove Saddam Hussein while the game was still under the Gamemaster Series, and was later licensed to Fantasy Flight Games for a 2012 re-release with new and updated rules.

See also
1984 in games

External links 
Review of Gamemaster board game series
Hasbro Company – A Brief Timeline

Board wargames
Milton Bradley Company games